If I Were Rich is a 1936 British comedy film directed by Randall Faye and starring Jack Melford, Kay Walsh and Clifford Heatherley.

Plot summary
A Socialist barber inherits an Earldom.

Cast
Jack Melford as Albert Mott
Kay Walsh as Chrissie de la Mothe
Clifford Heatherley as General de la Mothe
Minnie Rayner as Mrs. Mott
Henry Carlisle as Puttick
Frederick Bradshaw as Jack de la Mothe
Ruth Haven as Nancy
Quentin McPhearson as Higginbotham

Production
The film was made at Nettlefold Studios as a quota quickie for release by the Hollywood company. RKO Pictures. It was based on the play Humpty-Dumpty by Horace Annesley Vachell.

References

Bibliography
Chibnall, Steve. Quota Quickies: The Birth of the British 'B' Film. British Film Institute, 2007.
Low, Rachael. Filmmaking in 1930s Britain. George Allen & Unwin, 1985.
Wood, Linda. British Films, 1927–1939. British Film Institute, 1986.

External links

1936 films
British comedy films
British black-and-white films
1936 comedy films
Films directed by Randall Faye
Films shot at Nettlefold Studios
British films based on plays
1930s English-language films
1930s British films